Kingsley Pinda (born January 30, 1992) is a French professional basketball player who currently plays for ALM Évreux Basket of the LNB Pro B.

References

1992 births
Living people
French men's basketball players
SLUC Nancy Basket players
Basketball players from Paris
Shooting guards